Samuel L Randlett (born January 11, 1930 in New Jersey) is an American origami artist who helped develop the modern system for diagramming origami folds. Together with Robert Harbin he developed the notation introduced by Akira Yoshizawa to form what is now called the Yoshizawa-Randlett system. This was first described in Samuel Randlett's Art of Origami in 1961.

He graduated from Northwestern University and became a music professor; he still teaches piano. He became interested in paper-folding in 1958 and within a year had his own figures on display at the Cooper Union Museum for the Arts of Decoration in New York. At the age of 30 started work on The Art of Origami. His first wife Jean illustrated this and most of his subsequent books. He came to know most of the then fairly small origami community around the world and edited an origami newsletter called The Flapping Bird from 1969 to 1976.

Bibliography

References

External links
 
  (subscription needed)

Origami artists
Living people
1930 births
Northwestern University alumni